Aliyu Amba is a town in central Ethiopia.

Charles Johnston, who passed through this settlement 31 May 1841, described it as "perched upon a flat-topped isolated rock that, nearly at right angles with the road, juts across the upper end of a pretty little valley".

There is a weekly market in Aliyu Amba, which is held on Sunday. Educational facilities in the early 1990s included one primary and one junior secondary school.

History 
Aliyu Amba owed its importance to its location on the caravan route that stretched from Saqqa in the Gibe region at its western point to Harar in the east and Tadjoura on the Red Sea. It was the most important market of central Ethiopia in the early and middle 19th century, and its merchants were almost entirely Muslim. The rulers of Shewa and of Harar co-operated in keeping this west-east route open. As a result the two potentates were in regular contact, and the head of the Harari community in Aliyu Amba was appointed by the Emir of Harar. This town was also an important center of the amoleh trade in the 1830s, and Mordechai Abir notes that a 10 per cent duty on all sales rendered to the Shewan government 3,000 Maria Theresa Thalers in cash and the equivalent of 2,000 in kind.

At the height of its importance in the late 1870s, Aliyu Amba was estimated by Antonio Cecchi to have a population of about 4,000. However, when Emperor Menelik II moved his court from neighboring Ankober to Entoto (and later Addis Ababa), the town lost importance. It was not until 1990 that a road 16 kilometers in length was built to connect Aliyu Amba with Ankober by Lutheran organizations and the Mekane Yesus Church with the help of local workers. The Mekane Yesus have also started a program dedicated to reversing the land degradation of the farmland around the town.

Demographics 
Based on figures from the Central Statistical Agency in 2005, Aliyu Amba has an estimated total population of 2,873 of whom 1,431 are men and 1,442 are women. The inhabitants include members of the Argobba people. The 1994 census reported this town had a total population of 1,582 of whom 719 were men and 863 were women. It is one of four towns in Ankober woreda.

Notes 

Populated places in the Amhara Region